Sviatohorivka is an urban-type settlement in the Pokrovsk Raion, Donetsk Oblast (province) of eastern Ukraine. Population:

References

Urban-type settlements in Pokrovsk Raion